Documentary Now! is an American mockumentary television series, created by Fred Armisen, Bill Hader, Seth Meyers, and Rhys Thomas, that premiered on August 20, 2015, on IFC. Armisen and Hader star in many episodes, and Thomas and Alex Buono co-direct most episodes. Hosted by Helen Mirren, the series spoofs celebrated documentary films by parodying the style of each documentary with a similar, but fictitious, subject. The third season premiered on February 20, 2019. On April 8, 2019, the series was renewed for a fourth season, which premiered on October 19, 2022 and will also be released on AMC+.

Premise
Documentary Now! presents itself as a long-running news magazine for documentaries, initially celebrating its 50th season. Mirren appears at the beginning of each episode to introduce the "classic" documentary that the audience is about to see.

Cast 
 Key

Episodes

Season 1 (2015)

Season 2 (2016)

Season 3 (2019)

Season 4 (2022)

Production

Background
The idea for the series was born out of a pre-tape short film from Saturday Night Live, where Armisen, Hader and Meyers were former cast members. In 2013, in a season 38 episode with Vince Vaughn, Armisen and Hader portrayed aging British punk rock stars in a sketch titled, History of Punk: Ian Rubbish and the Bizzaros. Hader has stated the biggest inspirations for the series were Woody Allen's mockumentary films Take the Money and Run (1969), and Zelig (1983). During the origins of Documentary Now! Hader sent DVD copies of the Allen films to Rhys Thomas and co-director Alex Buono. Hader said “I told them, ‘This is the mood of the show: very serious, very dry, but with insane jokes and crazy moments. You don’t want to wink too much at the audience."

Development
On March 20, 2014, it was announced that IFC had given the production, then titled American Documentary, a series order for a first season consisting of six episodes. Executive producers were set to include Lorne Michaels, Seth Meyers, Fred Armisen, and Bill Hader. Production companies involved with the series were slated to consist of Broadway Video and Rhys Thomas was expected to serve as director. The six-episode order limited the first season of the show, as Seth Meyers revealed in an interview with Collider, stating that they were not able to spoof Michael Moore documentaries, or the HBO documentary miniseries The Jinx: The Life and Deaths of Robert Durst. Meyers further explained saying, "The Jinx happened a little too late for us. We almost tried to pull it off. We talked a lot about that kind of documentary, where the filmmaker sets out to make a documentary, and then, very slowly, it becomes clear the documentary is about himself." The producers also declined to do another This Is Spinal Tap–type mockumentary and consciously avoided any similarities in editing or style. Armisen commented, "Spinal Tap set such a great precedent that we had to watch out for repeating any of those same beats. It's one of the greatest movies ever."

On July 31, 2015, it was announced at the Television Critics Association's annual summer press tour that Meyers, Hader and Armisen would serve as writers for the series and that additional executive producers would include Thomas and Andrew Singer. On August 18, 2015, it was reported that IFC had renewed the series for a second and third season. It was additionally reported that the series had been co-created by Thomas who was also expected to serve in the role of director along with Alex Buono. John Mulaney was slated to be a consulting producer and Erik Kenward a supervising producer. On August 27, 2015, it was announced that IFC had decided to delay the premiere of the series' second episode "DRONEZ: The Hunt for El Chingon" following the live broadcast of two television news station employees' murders in Virginia the previous day. The episode "Kunuk Uncovered", originally set to air as the series' third episode, was broadcast in its place.

On August 1, 2018, it was announced that the third season would premiere on February 20, 2019. Additionally, it was reported that one of the episodes would be titled "Waiting for the Artist" and parody the documentary film Marina Abramovic: The Artist is Present. Later that month, it was announced that another episode, entitled "Original Cast Album: Co-Op", would parody D. A. Pennebaker's 1970 documentary Original Cast Album: Company. On September 6, 2018, two further season three episodes were announced. One episode, titled "Any Given Saturday Afternoon", was described as a parody of the 2006 documentary A League of Ordinary Gentlemen and set to feature guest stars including Kevin Dunn, Michael C. Hall, Tim Robinson, and Bobby Moynihan. The other episode, titled "Long Gone", was described as a parody of the 1988 documentary Let's Get Lost and was expected to include Natasha Lyonne in a guest starring role. On October 10, 2018, it was announced that the season three premiere episode had been titled "Batsh*t Valley" and that it would be a parody of Wild Wild Country and The Source Family.

Casting
Alongside the series order announcement, it was confirmed that Fred Armisen and Bill Hader would star in the series. On August 1, 2018, it was announced that Cate Blanchett would guest star in the third-season episode "Waiting for the Artist" as Barta, a performance artist. Later that month, it was reported that Taran Killam, John Mulaney, James Urbaniak, Alex Brightman, Richard Kind, Paula Pell, and Renée Elise Goldsberry would appear in a third-season episode titled "Original Cast Album: Co-Op". On September 6, 2018, further season three guest stars were announced including Kevin Dunn, Michael C. Hall, Tim Robinson, and Bobby Moynihan in the episode "Any Given Saturday Afternoon" and Natasha Lyonne in the episode "Long Gone". On October 10, 2018, it was announced that Owen Wilson, Michael Keaton, and Necar Zadegan would guest star in the third-season premiere episode "Batsh*t Valley".

Filming
In season one, two of the episodes were shot in Iceland and "DRONEZ: The Hunt for El Chingon" was filmed in Tijuana. To film the second-season episode "Final Transmission", the Documentary Now! crew staged a real-life concert (attracting around 1,000 people) in which Armisen, Hader, and guest star Maya Rudolph performed as the Talking Heads-inspired band the episode centers around. The season three episode "Waiting for the Artist" was filmed in Budapest, Hungary in mid-2018.

Release

Marketing
On January 17, 2019, the official trailer for season three was released.

Premieres
On January 27, 2019, the premiere of the third season was held at the Egyptian Theatre in Park City, Utah during the 2019 Sundance Film Festival. The premiere featured screenings of the episodes Waiting for the Artist and Original Cast Album: Co-Op.

In February 2022, the series' fourth season was announced and premiered on October 19, 2022.

In advance of their television broadcast, the episodes My Monkey Grifter, Two Hairdressers in Bagglyport and Trouver Frisson were premiered in the Documentary slate at the Toronto International Film Festival on September 9, 2022.

Reception and legacy

Critical response

Season 1
The first season was received positively by critics upon its premiere. On the review aggregation website Rotten Tomatoes, the season holds a 90% approval rating, with an average rating of 7.89 out of 10 based on 29 reviews. The website's critical consensus reads, "Boasting a talented cast and smart writing, Documentary Now! is a clever send-up of non-fiction filmmaking, though some may find themselves outside the narrow scope of its humor." Metacritic, which uses a weighted average, assigned the season a score of 79 out of 100 based on 32 critics, indicating "generally favorable reviews."

In its year-end roundup, The New York Times named Documentary Now! as one of "The Best TV Shows of 2015". "This series, introduced in August," wrote Times critic Neil Genzlinger, "consists not of actual documentaries but of parodies of actual documentaries. It sure is funny, though."

Season 2
The second season was met with a positive response from critics upon its premiere. On the review aggregation website Rotten Tomatoes, the season holds a 93% approval rating, with an average rating of 7.84 out of 10 based on 15 reviews. The website's critical consensus reads, "With extreme attention to detail, Documentary Now! furthers its hilarious tribute to vintage documentaries through showcasing creators Hader and Armisen's multi-talents, topped with brilliantly by earnestly dramatic introductions by Dame Helen Mirren." Metacritic, which uses a weighted average, assigned the season a score of 74 out of 100 based on 7 critics, indicating "generally favorable reviews".

Season 3
The third season was met with critical acclaim from critics upon its premiere. On the review aggregation website Rotten Tomatoes, the season holds a 100% approval rating, with an average rating of 9.29 out of 10 based on 23 reviews. The website's critical consensus reads, "Incisively critical of the genre and equally delighted by its subjects, Documentary Now! nails mockumentary under the deft direction of Rhys Thomas and Alex Buono." Metacritic, which uses a weighted average, assigned the season a score of 88 out of 100 based on 8 critics, indicating "universal acclaim".

Awards and nominations

Home media
The first two seasons were released by Mill Creek Entertainment on DVD and Blu-ray on August 14, 2018. The episode "Globesman" was included as a bonus feature in the Criterion Collection Blu-ray release of Salesman, while "Original Cast Album: Co-Op" was included as a bonus feature in the Criterion Collection DVD and Blu-ray release for Original Cast Album: Company, with a reunion of the cast and crew of the episode included as an additional feature.

Soundtrack
The soundtrack for the Season 3 episode Co-Op was made available as an actual cast album in 2019 (profits for the album were donated to Broadway Cares/Equity Fights AIDS).

References

External links

IFC's playlist of excerpts and trailers on official YouTube channel

2015 American television series debuts
2010s American satirical television series
English-language television shows
IFC (American TV channel) original programming
2010s American anthology television series
2010s American mockumentary television series
Works about documentary film
Television series about filmmaking
Television series created by Bill Hader
Television series by Broadway Video
2010s American parody television series
Self-reflexive television
Documentary Now!